Cwmcarvan is a small rural village in Monmouthshire, south east Wales.  It is located 4 miles south west of Monmouth and about 4 miles east of Raglan, off the old A40 road two miles NW of Trellech.

History and amenities

Church of St. Catwg

The church dates from the 13th or 14th century. It is in the Early English and Perpendicular styles, with some 16th-century features. It was heavily restored in the 1870s.  The dedication is to St Catwg or Cadoc, a Welsh saint of the 6th century. There are porches on both the south and north sides, supposedly so that the squires of Cwmbychan and Trevildu within the parish did not have to enter through the same door as each other.

Craig-y-dorth
The hill of Craig-y-dorth, 1 mile north east of the church, was the site of a battle in 1404 between Owain Glyndŵr's rebels and English forces. According to the Annals of Owain Glyn Dwr, "There the English were killed for the most part and they were pursued up to the gates of the town" (of Monmouth). The hamlet of Craig-y-dorth is one of the only two communities in Monmouthshire with its own flag, the other being the town of Monmouth.

High Glanau
The house at High Glanau was built in 1923 for the writer and garden designer Henry Avray Tipping.

References

External links 
 Genuki basic info on the village
  Kelly's Directory 1901
  Geograph photos of Cwmcarvan

Villages in Monmouthshire